Sardar Patel University (SPU) is a public state university in Vallabh Vidyanagar, a town Gujarat, India. It is named after the iron man of India Vallabhbhai Patel, and was founded in October 1955 by an Act of the Legislative Assembly  of the then-Bombay Province and was UGC recognized under 2(f) of the UGC  Act in October 1968. Originally, it had the status of a rural university but now it has diversified with the motto of "Excellence Matters".

History
 
The Sardar Patel University was the dream of Shri Bhaikaka. In fact,  Bhaikaka was at the peak of his career as an engineer, when he sought early retirement from Government Service in 1940 at the behest of Sardar Vallabhbhai Patel, and joined Ahmedabad Municipality as a Chief Engineer. This was the time when his mentor, Sardar Patel, began to visualise what a soon-to-be independent India would require. Patel advised Bhaikaka to give up engineering and help Patel in transforming Charotar into the focal point of India. Serving the rural countryside would control migration of people from villages to towns in search of education, employment, and healthcare. Bhaikaka resigned from this office too in 1942 at the behest of Sardar Patel, and was appointed as Chairman of Charotar Education Society in Anand, a few years before moving on to what we now know as the township of Vallabh Vidyanagar on 3 March 1946, but not before registering Charutar Vidya Mandal as a Charitable Education Trust on 10 August 1945. What was once a wilderness at the tri-junction of Karamsad, Bakrol, and Anand thus became Vallabh Vidyanagar, and the ‘Vallabh’ was prefixed to ‘Vidyanagar’ in recognition of Sardar's advice to work for rural uplift. Containing migration required that the reasons for migration be addressed, and Bhaikaka began to work on a plan together with Shri Bhikhabhai Patel, a dedicated and farsighted educationist, who shared Bhaikaka's vision.

Location
Anand-Vidyanagar is on the Vadodara-Ahmedabad Railway line of the Western Railway in the heart of the Anand District of Gujarat. It is well connected with the rest of the country by railway network and roads. It is flanked by the two major airports of Gujarat: Sardar Patel International Airport at Ahmedabad and the Vadodara Airport, Vadodara. Vidyanagar is considered as Gujarat's education hub. Vidyanagar is also known for a student friendly environment and student diversity.

Jurisdiction 
At the time of the enactment of the Sardar Patel University Act 1955 the area of the jusrisdiction of the university (known as Sardar Vallabhbhai Vidyapeeth at that time) was limited to the 5 miles of Vallabh Vidyanagar. As of now till the latest amendment (Guj. 26 of 2015) the university has its jurisdiction over 2 districts.

Faculties and Departments under them

 Arts
 Department of Communication and Media Studies
 Department of English
 Department of Economics
 Department of Gujarati
 Department of Hindi
 Department of History
 Department of Library and Information Science
 Department of Political Science
 Department of Psychology 
 Department of Sanskrit
 Department of Social Work (MSW)
 Department of Sociology
 Business Studies
 Department of Business Studies
 Education
 Department of Education
 M B Patel College of Education (B Ed) (Constituent College)
 Engineering and Technology
 Department of Applied and Interdisciplinary Sciences
 Home Science
 Department of Home Science
 Law
 Department of Law
 Management
 Department of Business Management
 Pharmaceutical Sciences
 Department of Pharmaceutical Sciences
 Sciences
 Department of Biosciences
 Department of Computer Science and Technology
 Department of Chemistry
 Department of Electronics
 Department of Materials Science
 Department of Mathematics
 Department of Physics
 Department of Statistics

Affiliated Colleges

Arts
Anand Arts College, Anand
Anand Institute of P.G. Studies in Arts, Anand
H.M. Patel Institute of English Training & Research, Vallabh Vidyanagar
Institute Of Language Studies & Applied Social Sciences(ILSASS), Vallabh Vidyanagar
Institute of Studies & Research in Renewal Energy, Vallabh Vidyanagar
Nalini Arvind & T.V. Patel Arts College, Vallabh Vidyanagar
N.S. Patel Arts College, Anand
Paionner Arts College, Anand
Shri Bhaikhabhai Patel Arts College, Anand
Shri Bhikhbhai Patel Institute of PG Studies in Research and Humanities, Anand
Shree J.M. Patel Arts College, Anand

Architecture
D C Patel School Of Architecture (APIED), Vallabh Vidyanagar
Shantaben Manubhai Patel Institute of Architecture & Interior Design, New Vallabh Vidyanagar

Commerce
B.J. Vanijya Mahavidyalaya (BJVM), Vallabh Vidyanagar
AIMS College Of Management And Technology, Bakrol
Anand Commerce College, Anand
Anand Institute of Business Studies (AIBS), Anand
Anand Mercantile college of science, management & computer technology, (AMCOST)
C.P. Patel and H.F. Shah Commerce College, Anand
C.Z. Patel College Of Business & Management, New Vallabh Vidyanagar
Shri D N Patel Institute of P.G. Studies Commerce, Anand
Shri D N Institute of Business Administration, Anand
Gordhandas Jamnadas Patel College of Management & Technology, Vallabh Vidyanagar
Jivkaran Group Of Institute, Vallabh Vidyanagar
Sant Stifan Institute of Business Management & Technology, Anand
Sardar Gunj Mercantile Co-operative (Anand) English Medium College Of Commerce & Management, Vallabh Vidyanagar
Sardar Patel College of Administration & Management, Anand
Shri P.M. Patel Institute of Business Administration, Anand
Shri V.Z. Patel Commerce College, Anand
Takshishila College of Management & Technology, Bakrol

Education
Anand Education College, Anand
Christian College of Education, Anand
M.B. Patel College of Education, Anand
N.H. Patel College of Education, Anand
Waymade College Of Education, Anand
I J Patel B.Ed College, Mogri
I J Patel M.Ed Course, Mogri

Fine Arts
IPCowala Santram College of Fine Arts, Vallabh Vidyanagar
Kala Kendra College of Music and Dance, Vallabh Vidyanagar
Rama Manubhai Desai College Of Music And Dance, Anand
CVM College of Fine Arts, Vallabh Vidyanagar

Home Science
S.M. Patel College of Home Science, Vallabh Vidyanagar
Smt. Kamlaben P. Patel College of Home Science, Anand

Law
Anand Law College, Anand
P.M. Patel College Of Law And Human Rights, Anand
R N Ipcowala School of Law & Justice, Vallabh Vidyanagar
Vinayak college of law and justice

Medical and Paramedical
Anand Homeopathic Medical College & Research Institute, Anand
G.H. Patel School of Nursing, Anand
K. M. Patel College of Physiotherapy, Karamsad
Institute of Diploma in Medical Laboratory Technology, Anand
Pramukhswami Medical College, Karamsad
Shree Dr. V.H. Dave Homeopathic Medical College, Anand
Shree P.M Patel College of Paramedical Science & Technology, Anand
Shri Babubhai G. Patel College of Physiotherapy, Anand
Smt. Kamlaben P. Patel Institute of Physiotherapy, Anand
Smt. L. P. Patel Institute of Medical Laboratory Technology, Karamsad

Science
Anand Mercantile College Of Science And Computer Technology (AMCOST), Anand
Ashok And Rita Patel Institute Of Integraterd Study & Research In Biotechnology And Allied Science (ARIBAS), New Vallabh Vidyanagar
B.N.Patel science College, Anand
Institute Of Science And Technology For Advance Studies & Research (ISTAR), Vallabh Vidyanagar 
M.B. Patel Science College, Anand
M.B. Patel Applied Science College, Mogri
N.V. Patel College Of Pure And Applied Sciences (NVPAS), Vallabh Vidyanagar
Shri A.N. Patel P.G. Institute, Anand
Shri P.M. Patel Institute Of Biosciences, Anand
Shri P.M. Patel Institute of Integrated M.Sc. in Biotechnology, Anand
Shri P.M. Patel Institute Of P.G. Studies And Research In Applied Sciences, Anand
V.P. & R.P.T.P. Science College, Vallabh Vidyanagar

Social Work
Institute Of Language Studies & Applied Social Sciences (ILSASS), Vallabh Vidyanagar
Anand Institute of Social Work, Anand
Shree J.M. Patel Institute of Social Work & Applied Arts, Anand
Shree J.M. Patel College of P.G. Studies & Research in Huminities, Anand
N.S.Patel Institute of Social Work, Anand
IILYAS Institute of Social Work, Vallabh Vidyanagar
Jeevkiran Institute of Social Work, Vallabh Vidyanagar
Center for Studies & Research on Life & Works of Sarkar Vallabhbhai Patel, Vallabh Vidyanagar

Computer Science
D N Institute of Computer Application, Anand
St. Stephen Institute of Business Management & Technology, Anand

See also
 List of universities in India
 Universities and colleges in India
 Education in India
 Distance Education Council
 University Grants Commission (India)

External links
 Official website

References 

Universities in Gujarat
Education in Anand district
1955 establishments in Bombay State
Educational institutions established in 1955